These are narrow-gauge railways at military establishments and former UK Government-owned explosives sites. These locations were often subject to the Official Secrets Act and other government restrictions, so many of them are less well documented.

The industrial use of narrow-gauge railways was quite extensive amongst the various military and civilian explosive factories, for example ICI Nobel's works at Ardeer and the Agency Explosive Factories run by ICI Nobel in the Second World War. In another example, the Ministry of Supply (MOS) Factory Dalbeattie used  gauge with a variety of bogie trucks mostly pushed by teams of three to six women. Stores, explosives, chemicals, rubbish and sewage, were all transported on this narrow-gauge system, which used at least  of track.

Weapons range railways

Armaments depots and ordnance factories

National Filling Factories (WW1) 

These factories were created during WW1 to unite the explosives, detonator, etc and the shell casings to make live munitions. This activity had the highest explosion risk, so precautions were very strict. They all followed a similar pattern in having standard-gauge rail sidings separate from the filling area. These were used for delivery of the raw materials and for shipping out the products. The interior 'clean area' for filling comprised many small lightweight huts over a large area linked by raised walkways upon which lightweight 2 foot gauge rail was laid. Trolleys with bronze wheels were normally moved by hand between these buildings, though ponies or horses were sometimes used.

Production ceased at the factories at the end of the war, though some of them were used for dismantling ammunition into the early 1920s. Some clues as to the railways on these sites come from the auctions as the sites were cleared, examples are :

 No 7 National Filling Factory in Hayes, Middlesex auction included 5,000 yards of light Decauville track.
 No 10 National Filling Factory in Foleshill, Coventry auction listed 20 tons Decauville track (16lbs), 50 light and heavy turntables on ball and roller bearings.

Explosives stores (magazines) were in some cases remote from the clean area, and towards the end of the war there were a few orders for internal combustion locos to move materials. No 7 Filling Factory at Hayes had an entirely separate explosives magazine at Northolt, where a main line siding was linked to the 20 separate storage bunkers by light rail. 100 tons of explosives were moved each day by rail to the Hayes plant for processing. Records exist of two Baguley 2 foot gauge internal combustion locos ordered in 1917 by No 7 National Filling Factory for Northolt. Seven similar locos were ordered in 1917 for No 2 National Filling Factory at Aintree, so this must also have had light rail outside the main assembly area, such as for storage of shell cases (as this factory was designed to handle ship loads of munitions components received from overseas at Liverpool Docks).

Supply depots

Fortifications

Training camps

Others

See also 
 War Department Light Railways
 British industrial narrow-gauge railways
 British narrow-gauge railways

References

External links 
 Narrow Gauge Railway Society
 Industrial Railway Society

Industrial railways in the United Kingdom
Military equipment of the United Kingdom
 Military